The term Orthodoxy in Armenia may refer to:

 Eastern Orthodoxy in Armenia, representing adherents, communities and institutions of various Eastern Orthodox Churches, in Armenia
 Oriental Orthodoxy in Armenia, representing adherents, communities and institutions of various Oriental Orthodox Churches, in Armenia
 any other form of orthodoxy in Armenia (political, ideological, social, economic, scientific, artistic)

See also
 Orthodoxy (disambiguation)
 Armenia (disambiguation)
 Orthodox Church (disambiguation)